Momine Khatun Mausoleum (or Mu'mine Khatun) is a 12th century mausoleum located in the city of Nakchivan in Azerbaijan.

The mausoleums of Nakhchivan were nominated for the UNESCO List of World Heritage Sites in 1998 by Gulnara Mehmandarova, the president of the Azerbaijan Committee of ICOMOS.

History

Momine Khatun Mausoleum, a monument of the Azerbaijani architecture (monuments of the architectural school of Nakhichevan – Maragha) was built in the west part of Nakhchivan city (within the Atabek Complex of Architecture in Nakhchivan city’s historical centre) in 1186. The mausoleum is the only monument that has reached our era from that complex. Shamsaddin Eldaniz, the founder of the Azerbaijan Atabaylar state (Eldiguzids) initiated to erect a mausoleum on the grave of his wife Momine Khatun. However, its construction was finished by Mahammad Jahan Pahlavan, the son of Shamsaddin Eldeniz, in A.H. 582, in the Maharram month (April 1186). According to some investigators, Shamsaddin Eldaniz, the ruler of the Atabaylar state, his wife Momine Khatun, and his son Mahammad Jahan Pahlavan were buried in the mausoleum. Later, the headstones of the buried people in the tomb probably were robbed and taken away. The photos and paintings of the 19th century show that there were monumental buildings and also Jameh mosque around the mausoleum. Its architect, Ajami Nakhchivani, also built the nearby Yusif ibn Kuseyir Mausoleum. The mausoleum was probably originally built with a madrassa. Drawings and photographs of the site from the nineteenth century confirm that it existed as part of a religious and educational complex which no longer exists.

The mausoleum was heavily restored in 1999-2003, as part of the Azerbaijan Cultural Heritage Support Project of the World Bank. It was depicted on the obverse of the Azerbaijani 50,000 manat banknote of 1996-2006.

Description
Momine Khatun Mausoleum is the most outstanding landmark in Nakhchivan decorated with a complex geometric pattern and quotes from the Koran. Grand decahedral mausoleum was considered as medieval skyscraper reaching 34 meters in height. Today it is only 25 meters high. Each side of the surface is completely covered with Arab writings in kufic style, styled as geometric patterns. The ornaments of the nine out of ten (sides) are different. Only one repeats itself, on the recess where it was supposed to be an exit. The top of the mausoleum is decorated by a stalactite composition. In the head arch of the monument these words were written in Kufic: “We pass away, but only the wind is left behind us. We die, but only the work is left as a present”. The mausoleum consists of underground (vault) and aboveground parts. The aboveground part of the mausoleum is decagonal from the exterior (it was bordered with the Kufic inscriptions on either side), but its interior is round formed. There are four round medallions in which the names of the Caliphs were written inside the dome. According to its completion, the Western part of the mausoleum differs. Here the surface was divided into two parts: in the under part, the entrance door was completed in the head arch form, but in the above part the ornamental designs were given. The inscriptions showing the name of the sculptor and the date of its construction were engraved in the above of the head arch. The burial place of Momine-Khatun is under the building but there is no entrance to it. Inside the mausoleum has a round shape. The only decorations of its interior are four round medallions covered with inscriptions and ornaments. These medallions are placed on the inner side of the spherical dome of the mausoleum and bear the names of the Prophet Mohammed, and four rashidun (caliphs) - Abu Bakr, Omar, Osman, Ali and his sons Hassan and Hussein. The Mausoleum of Momine-Khatun is distinguished by an imperial grandeur. On the top of the tomb, in the writings above – in the main book of the monument, it is written: “This tomb was ordered to be built by educated in the world, just and great victor Shamsaddin Nusrat al- Islam and al Muslimin Jahan Pahlavan Abu Jafar Muhammad ibn Atabay Atabay Eldagiz for the memory of religion in the world, Islam, and fame of the Muslims - Momina Khatun!”

The solid brick walls of the mausoleum are pierced by two small windows facing West, with an additional window above the main entrance. A band of inscription in Kufic characters composed of turquoise tiles runs below the muqarnas cornice. The recessed surface of its twelve exterior facets are covered with carved geometric motifs on brick, which are highlighted by turquoise tiles, and set in a rectangular frame that includes a small muqarnas crown. Inside, the burial chamber is circular in plan, with bare walls.

The Mausoleum of Mu'mine Khatun is representative of the Nakhchivan architectural tradition of the medieval era, which was heavily influenced by the works of the Azerbaijani architect Adjemi ibn Kuseyir. The Nakhchivani style differed from the Shirvani styles, prevailing in Absheron, in its use of brick as the basic construction material and the use of coloured, especially turquoise enamelled tiles, for decoration.

Facade 
Momine Khatun Mausoleum is a prismatic tower with similar ornaments on all sides, including the eastern face where there the entrance door to the tomb is located. The rectangular entrance to the tower was built in the form of a shallow sharp arch. The inscriptive plaque above it indicates the architect and the construction time of the mausoleum which is in Kufic-style. The edges of the sharp niches are covered with composite geometric patterns and thin columns (15 cm in diameter), and the inner surfaces do not repeat each other. The bright blue-turquoise bricks used in the decoration of the sharp niches on each face. The ten-sided tower’s edges form П-shaped frame and include the niches. These frames are covered with Kufic-style inscription that made of bricks. Most probably the inscriptions are texts from Surah Yaseen in Koran. 

Most of geometrical ornaments on the surfaces are composed of multi-pointed stars and the lines spread from them. There are 5, 6, 8 pointed stars and 6, 8 angular geometric figures on each face.

Interior 
There are four circular medallions on the perpendicular arrows (diameter 1.5 m) in the interior of the dome's brick rows. The ornaments were made of the mix of gypsum and clay and consist of Kufi-style compositions. The essence of all the compositions is the word "Allah". Omar, Osman, Ali words intersect with each other, forming 6, 8 and 10 pointed stars and surround the word “Allah”.

Gallery

See also
 List of mausolea

References 

Mausoleums in Azerbaijan
Buildings and structures in the Nakhchivan Autonomous Republic
Tourist attractions in Azerbaijan
Tourist attractions in Nakhchivan
Decagonal buildings
Ajami Nakhchivani buildings and structures